Of Two Minds is a documentary filmed and directed by Lisa Klein and Doug Blush, that touches on the lives of different individuals suffering from bipolar disorder. Klein chose to proceed with the documentary came about when she read Liz Spikol’s article in Philadelphia Weekly on her life with bipolar disorder.

Synopsis 
The documentary focuses on the daily struggles that these individuals face involving the complications that arise from being in relationships, troubles with working and maintaining jobs, and medical insurance issues. Klein discusses her sister Tina, who died in 1994, and her efforts to understand this disease and how it impacts Individuals suffering from it.

Cast 

 Tina Klein
 Cheri Keating
 Michael “Petey” Peterson
Carlton Davis
 Liz Spikol

Reception 
Of Two Minds was reviewed by the Los Angeles Times and Variety, the former of which stated that "does give a vivid picture of what life is like for these folks, though it has a tendency to take unnecessary detours to other interviewees and to reveal a little too much about the intimate lives of the three key subjects."

References

External links 
 

2012 documentary films
2012 films
Schizophrenia
2010s English-language films